Visit Wales  is the Welsh Government's tourism organisation. Its aim is to promote Welsh tourism and assist the tourism industry.

History 

The Wales Tourist Board was established in 1969 as a result of the Development of Tourism Act 1969 and its role was enhanced following the Tourism (Overseas promotion) (Wales) Act 1992. An 'Abolition Order' was passed by the National Assembly for Wales 23 November 2005 and full transfer of functions into the Welsh Assembly Government was made 1 April 2006. On that day, the Wales Tourist Board ceased to exist.

Visit Wales changed their prominent campaign of "Visit Wales" in late March 2020 due to the high numbers of visitors from Wales and the United Kingdom to tourist hotspots to "Visit Wales. Later." Additionally they stated, "Please do not visit Wales at this time and avoid all unnecessary travel within Wales."

Visit Wales has taken over the functions of the former Wales Tourist Board, an Assembly Sponsored Public Body.  The role of Visit Wales is to support the Welsh tourism industry, improve tourism in Wales and provide a strategic framework within which private enterprise can achieve sustainable growth and success, so improving the social and economic well being of Wales. The mission of Visit Wales is to "maximise tourism's contribution to the economic, social and cultural prosperity of Wales".

The baseline budget at the Wales Tourist Board for 2005/2006 was £22.6 million.

Its stated goals are: to grow a stronger and more defined brand for tourism in Wales; to focus investment and innovation in tourism; to drive an increase in visitor volume and value to Wales each year.

Welsh tourist industry 

Tourists spend over £8 million a day on trips in Wales, amounting to around £3 billion a year. In direct terms, tourism contributes 3.7% of whole-economy value added in Wales. Approximately 100,000 people in Wales are employed in tourism, representing about 9% of the workforce.

Over one million trips are taken to Wales annually by overseas tourists. The general United Kingdom accounts for 93% of tourism trips to Wales. Seventy percent of tourists to Wales come from other parts of the United Kingdom for a holiday, 20% to visit friends or relatives and 7% for a business trip. Fifty percent of trips by UK tourists to Wales go to the countryside or small towns/villages. The most popular origins of overseas visitors are Republic of Ireland, United States, and Germany.

The most popular activities undertaken by tourists in Wales are: walking, swimming, visiting historic attractions such as castles and visiting museums and galleries. The most popular attraction in Wales is the Museum of Welsh Life which attracts over 600,000 visitors annually.

In serviced accommodation in Wales, there are over 80,000 bed spaces available.

Tourist Information Centres 

There are 65 tourist information centres around Wales, offering local information, accommodation booking services and other services.

This network of centres offers a service to the 13 million visitors that come to Wales every year. They are run by over 40 different managing authorities and Visit Wales co-ordinates the network to set and monitor standards of presentation, information and customer care.

See also
VisitBritain
VisitEngland
VisitScotland

References

External links
Global website - www.visitwales.com - The official guide to places to stay and things to do in Wales.
Welsh Government - Tourism

Welsh Government
Economy of Wales
Machynlleth
Welsh Government sponsored bodies
Tourist attractions in Wales
Welsh executive agencies
Tourism in Wales
Tourism organisations in the United Kingdom
Tourism agencies